Rodrigo Martins Vaz, known as Rodrigo (born 24 May 1971), is a retired Brazilian footballer.

Rodrigo played for several clubs in Finnish Veikkausliiga and one season for USM Blida in the Algerian Ligue Professionnelle 1. He played a total of 181 Veikkausliiga caps and scored 44 goals.

Honours  
Finnish Championship: 1993, 1996, 1997

References 
Bibliography
Profissionais do Figueirense Futebol Clube (in Portuguese)
Citations

1971 births
Footballers from Curitiba
Brazilian footballers
Clube Atlético Bragantino players
Brazilian expatriate footballers
Expatriate footballers in Finland
Veikkausliiga players
FC Jazz players
Helsingin Jalkapalloklubi players
FC Lahti players
Tampere United players
Expatriate footballers in Algeria
Algerian Ligue Professionnelle 1 players
USM Blida players
Living people
Brazilian expatriate sportspeople in Algeria
Association football midfielders